Bactria is a genus of robber flies in the family Asilidae. There are at least three described species in Bactria.

Species
These three species belong to the genus Bactria:
 Bactria hypoleucochaeta (Bezzi, 1908) c g
 Bactria rhopalocera (Karsch, 1888) c g
 Bactria vagator (Wiedemann, 1828) c g
Data sources: i = ITIS, c = Catalogue of Life, g = GBIF, b = Bugguide.net

References

Further reading

External links

 
 

Asilidae genera